The Half Breed is a 1922 American silent Western film directed by Charles A. Taylor and starring Wheeler Oakman, Ann May and Mary Anderson.

Cast
 Wheeler Oakman as Delmar Spavinaw, the halfbreed
 Ann May as Doll Pardeau
 Mary Anderson as Evelyn Huntington
 Hugh Thompson as Ross Kennion
 King Evers as Dick Kennion
 Joseph J. Dowling as Judge Huntington
 Lew Harvey as The Snake
 Herbert Prior as Ned Greenwood 
 Sidney De Gray as Leon Pardeau
 Nick De Ruiz as Juan Del Rey
 Leela Lane as Isabelle Pardeau
 Eugenia Gilbert as Marianne
 Carl Stockdale as John Spavinaw
 Evelyn Selbie as Mary
 Doris Deane as Nanette 
 Albert S. Lloyd as Hops
 George Kuwa as Kito

References

Bibliography
 Langman, Larry. American Film Cycles: The Silent Era. Greenwood Publishing, 1998.

External links
 

1922 films
1922 Western (genre) films
American black-and-white films
First National Pictures films
Silent American Western (genre) films
1920s English-language films
1920s American films